is a Japanese bobsledder who has competed since 1999. Competing in two Winter Olympics, he earned his best finish of 20th in the four-man event at Salt Lake City in 2002.

Kobayashi's best finish at the FIBT World Championships was 19th in the four-man event at Lake Placid, New York in 2009. His best World Cup finish was 21st in a four-man event at Cesana in 2005.

References

Sports-Reference.com profile

1979 births
Bobsledders at the 2002 Winter Olympics
Bobsledders at the 2010 Winter Olympics
Japanese male bobsledders
Living people
Olympic bobsledders of Japan